

The Korean Air Chang-Gong 91 is a four-seat single-engined low-wing monoplane designed by the Korea Institute of Aeronautical Technology and built by the Aerospace Division of Korean Air.

Specifications

See also

References

Notes

Bibliography

Aircraft manufactured in South Korea